Shehi is a panchayat village in Maharashtra, India. Administratively, it is under Navapur Taluka of Nandurbar District in Maharashtra.

There are three villages in the Shehi gram panchayat: Shehi, Kasare, and Marod.

Demographics 
In the 2001 census, the village of Shehi had 2,101 inhabitants, with 1,030 males (49.0%) and 1,071 females (51.0%), for a gender ratio of 1040 females per thousand males.

Religion
The majority of the people in Kasare are Hindu. There are several temples in the village.

See also
 Navapur
आदिवासी हाय रा
हुनाट्या पोयरा

Notes

Villages in Nandurbar district